Saddle Island can refer to the following
 Saddle Island, South Orkney Islands
 Saddle Island, South Georgia 
 Saddle Island, Newfoundland and Labrador
 Saddle Island (Western Australia)
 Saddle Island, the older name of Mota Lava, an island of northern Vanuatu
 Saddle Islands, one of the name for Shengsi Islands off Shanghai